Discovery Bay Ferry Pier is a two-storey ferry pier in Discovery Bay, Lantau Island, New Territories, Hong Kong. It is located near La Costa and Costa Court and opposite Discovery Bay Plaza and a bus terminus.

References

Piers in Hong Kong
Discovery Bay